Bill Ruppert (born June 10, 1954) is an American musician, known as one of the most prolific and widely heard studio guitarists, logging nearly 10,000 sessions in a career spanning over 30 years.

As a first-call studio guitarist and session musician, Ruppert has worked with a roster of top artist and commercial clients since the 1980s. He recorded guitar with Bryan Ferry of Roxy Music, Phil Collins of Genesis, Chuck Mangione and Richie Havens. In conjunction with Electro-Harmonix, he has created a series of Effectology videos using effects pedals to imitate different instruments, recreate classic songs, and mimic real-life sounds. Working with Electro-Harmonix, Ruppert was one of the principal designers of the B9/C9 organ machines as well as the Key9 electric piano machine, Mel9 Mellotron emulator, Synth9 synth machine, Bass9 bass machine and String9 String Ensemble. Ruppert has also worked with the Kemper profiling amplifier company as a consultant and sound designer.

Life and career 
Ruppert was born in Chicago, Illinois to Frances and Clyde Ruppert. Clyde Ruppert was a saxophonist who played in the Glenn Miller division of the Air Force Band during WWII and later touring the world with Guy Lombardo Orchestra and other popular big bands. Ruppert's grandfather played drums with a young Benny Goodman during Goodman's early years in Chicago.

Growing up in a musical family, Ruppert focused his goals in that direction. After graduating from college, Bill taught guitar/music to grammar school and college students. By 1986, he was the first-call guitarist in the Chicago commercial studio scene.

Awards 
Ruppert won a Clio Award in 1989 for his advertising music production role in the Durasoft Color Contacts commercial "Parachute" for Young & Rubicam, Chicago.

Effectology 
In 2009, Ruppert began creating a video series called Effectology, in which he recreated extraordinary sounds with a regular electric guitar and Electro-Harmonix gear. Topics ranging from inventing Halloween sounds to re-creating Kraftwerk's 'Autobahn' to generating Caribbean steel drum effects are covered.
Ruppert is currently working with the design team at Electro-Harmonix creating new effects for electric guitar.

Selected Discography 
Ruppert played on hundreds of commercially released recordings and soundtracks. These lists represent only a small fraction of his recorded performances.

Album credits on guitar 
 Made in California (The Beach Boys, 2013)
 Black Robes and Lawyers (William Michael Dillon, 2011)
 Johnny Boy Would Love This: A Tribute to John Martyn (Various Artists, 2011)
 If Only... (Howard Hewett, 2007)
 Squur Dance (B-Cow, 2007)
 Hurricane Season (Shanna Zell, 2005)
 Have a Little Faith (Mavis Staples, 2004)
 Rough Grooves Surface (Tree Thirteen, 2004)
 Change Is Good (Lonie Walker, 2002)
 Couldn't Love You No More/No Little Boy (John Martyn, 2000)
 Times Like These (Rick Danko, 2000)
 Stars and Stripes, Vol. 1 (The Beach Boys, 1996)
 No Big Surprise: Anthology (Steve Goodman, 1994)
 No Little Boy (John Martyn, 1993)
 Boomchild (Dennis DeYoung, 1988)
 Keys to the City (Ramsey Lewis, 1987)
 Simple Things (Richie Havens, 1987)
 Unfinished Business (Steve Goodman, 1987)
  Bête Noire (Bryan Ferry, 1987)
 Save Tonight for Me (Chuck Mangione, 1986)
 Robin Angel (Robin Angel, 1986)
 You Love Looks Good on Me (Gene Chandler, 1985)
 Marbles (Software, 1981)

Television Shows (partial list)

Television & Radio Commercials (partial list) 
Ruppert played on thousands of television and radio commercials. These lists represent only a small fraction of his recorded performances. The full list of credits is on record with the Chicago Federation of Musicians.

Personal life 
Ruppert married Joan Tortorici, television writer/producer, in 1977.

References 

American session musicians
American rock guitarists
American male guitarists
Guitarists from Illinois
20th-century American musicians
Living people
1954 births
20th-century American guitarists
20th-century American male musicians